Patricia Moore Henegan (born June 22, 1948) is an American politician. She is a member of the South Carolina House of Representatives from the 54th District, serving since 2014. She is a member of the Democratic party.

Henegan chaired the South Carolina Legislative Black Caucus. She serves on the House Judiciary and House Rules Committees.

Henegan was among a number of African American women from around the United States who endorsed Hillary Rodham Clinton for President in 2016.

References

External links 

1948 births
Living people
Democratic Party members of the South Carolina House of Representatives
21st-century American politicians
Francis Marion University alumni
Winthrop University alumni

Women state legislators in South Carolina